Lorenzo Sonego (born 11 May 1995) is an Italian professional tennis player. Sonego has a career high ATP singles ranking of world No. 21 achieved on 4 October 2021. He has a career high ATP doubles ranking of No. 60 achieved on 12 September 2022. Sonego made his ATP main-draw debut at the 2016 Internazionali BNL d'Italia, where he received a main-draw wildcard.

Early life
Sonego was born in Turin, Italy. He began playing tennis when he was 11 years old, encouraged by his father Giorgio and his coach Gipo Arbino. A fan of Italian football club Torino, he played for the Torino youth academy between the age of six and 13 before focusing on tennis. He has over a million streams on Spotify.

Career

2016–2017: ATP Tour debut and first Challenger title
He made his ATP Tour debut in May 2016 at the Italian Open, where he received a wild card and lost against João Sousa in the first round.

On 17 October 2017 he won his first Challenger title, defeating Tim Pütz at the 2017 Sparkassen ATP Challenger.

2018: Grand Slam debut
Sonego started his Grand Slam career with a win over Robin Haase at the 2018 Australian Open. He was then defeated in the second round by Richard Gasquet.

Sonego entered 2018 Wimbledon as a lucky loser after being defeated by Ernest Gulbis in the third round of qualifying. He was defeated by Taylor Fritz in the first round in straight sets.

2019: First ATP title, Masters 1000 quarterfinal
Sonego, as a qualifier, reached the quarterfinals of Monte-Carlo, upsetting 8th seed Karen Khachanov on the way. He lost to eventual runner-up Dušan Lajović in straight sets.

Sonego won his first ATP title in Antalya, Turkey in June 2019, defeating Serbian Miomir Kecmanović in three sets in the final.

2020: French Open fourth round, ATP 500 final, win over World no. 1
Sonego made a career-best 4th round appearance at the 2020 French Open, defeating Emilio Gómez, Alexander Bublik, and 27th seed Taylor Fritz before losing to 12th seed Diego Schwartzman in straight sets. His match against Fritz had the longest tiebreak in French Open history in the third set, finishing eventually with a 19–17 score in favor of Sonego.

At the 2020 Erste Bank Open, Sonego, as a lucky loser, shocked world No. 1 Novak Djokovic in straight sets 6-2 6–1. It was only Djokovic's third loss of the year. Sonego went on to make the final of the event, but lost to fifth seed Andrey Rublev 4–6, 4–6.

2021: Wimbledon fourth round, Masters 1000 semifinal, top 25 debut

At the 2021 Sardegna Open in April, Sonego won both the singles and doubles titles. As a result, he achieved career-high singles ranking of world No. 28 and doubles ranking of No. 132 on 12 April 2021.

In Rome, Sonego scored his second top-10 win over Dominic Thiem, beating him in 3 sets in a match lasting over 3 hours. As a result, he made his second Masters quarterfinal, where he beat 7th seed Andrey Rublev, his third top-10 win. In the semifinal, he once again faced World No. 1 and defending champion Novak Djokovic but lost in 3 sets.
At the French Open, Sonego lost in the first round to Lloyd Harris in straight sets.

In June, he reached his fourth final in his career and second for 2021 at the 2021 Eastbourne International where he lost to Alex De Minaur.

Following his fourth-round showing at the 2021 Wimbledon Championships for the first time in his career, he reached a career-high of World No. 25 on 9 August 2021.

2022: Drop in rankings, out of top 50, third ATP title
Sonego started his 2022 season at the Sydney Classic. Seeded fifth, he reached the quarterfinals where he lost to top seed and eventual champion, Aslan Karatsev. Seeded 25th at the Australian Open, he made it to the third round where he was defeated by Miomir Kecmanović.

Seeded fourth at the Córdoba Open, Sonego lost in the quarterfinals to sixth seed, last year finalist, and eventual champion, Albert Ramos Viñolas. Seeded third at the Argentina Open, he reached the semifinals where he was eliminated by second seed and defending champion, Diego Schwartzman. Seeded sixth at the Rio Open, he fell in the second round to qualifier Miomir Kecmanović. At the Mexican Open, he lost in the first round to qualifier J. J. Wolf. Representing Italy in the Davis Cup tie against Slovakia, Sonego played one match and lost to Filip Horanský. In the end, Italy won the tie over Slovakia 3-2. Seeded 21st at the Indian Wells Masters, he was ousted from the tournament in the second round by Benjamin Bonzi. Seeded 19th at the Miami Open, he lost in the second round to American qualifier Denis Kudla.

Sonego started his clay-court season at the Monte-Carlo Masters. Seeded 16th, he lost in the second round to Laslo Đere. Seeded 11th at the Barcelona Open, he was defeated in the third round by eighth seed and eventual finalist, Pablo Carreño Busta. In Madrid, he lost in the first round to British wildcard Jack Draper. Last year semifinalist at the Italian Open, he lost in a controversial first-round match to 13th seed Denis Shapovalov. Due to not defending his semifinalist points from last year, Sonego's ranking fell from 28 to 35. Seeded 32nd at the French Open, he reached the third round where he lost to eighth seed and eventual finalist, Casper Ruud, in five sets.

Sonego began his grass-court season at the BOSS Open in Stuttgart, Germany. Seeded sixth, he made it to the quarterfinals where he lost to second seed, compatriot, and eventual champion, Matteo Berrettini. At the Queen's Club Championships, he was defeated in the first round by lucky loser Denis Kudla. Last year finalist at the Eastbourne International, he fell in the second round to sixth seed and defending champion, Alex de Minaur, in a rematch of previous year's final. Seeded 27th at Wimbledon, he reached the third round where he was beaten by second seed, two-time champion, and former world no. 1, Rafael Nadal.

After Wimbledon, Sonego competed at the Swedish Open. He lost in the first round to Aslan Karatsev. In Gstaad, Switzerland, he was defeated in the first round by qualifier Juan Pablo Varillas.

At the 2022 Moselle Open he defeated Alexander Bublik in the final to win his third ATP title. As a result he climbed 20 positions up in the top 50 in the rankings to world No. 45 on 26 September 2022.

2023: Fifth top 10 win
Sonego started his 2023 season at the Adelaide International 1. He retired during the second set of his first-round match against third seed and world No. 7, Daniil Medvedev, due to a right arm injury. At the Adelaide International 2, he lost in the first round to Jack Draper. At the Australian Open, he lost in the second round to 10th seed and world No. 11, Hubert Hurkacz, in five sets.

In February, Sonego competed at the Open Sud de France. He reached the quarterfinals where he lost to second seed, world No. 17, compatriot, and eventual champion, Jannik Sinner. In Rotterdam, he was defeated in the first round by third seed, world No. 8, and defending champion, Félix Auger-Aliassime. At the Qatar ExxonMobil Open, he put up a fight, but he lost in the first round to two-time champion, former world No. 1, and eventual finalist, Andy Murray, in three sets, despite having three match points in the third set. At the Dubai Championships, he upset fourth seed and world No. 9, Félix Auger-Aliassime, in the second round for his first top 10 win of the season. He was eliminated in the quarterfinals by seventh seed and world No. 16, Alexander Zverev.

Performance timelines

Singles
Current through the 2023 Dubai Open.

ATP career finals

Singles: 5 (3 titles, 2 runner-ups)

Doubles: 2 (2 titles)

ATP Challenger and ITF Futures finals

Singles: 11 (6–5)

Record against other players

Wins over top 10 players
Sonego has a  record against players who were, at the time the match was played, ranked in the top 10.

Record against top 10 players
Sonego's record against players who have been ranked in the top 10, with those who are active in boldface. Only ATP Tour main draw matches are considered:

Record against players ranked No. 11–20

Active players are in boldface. 

 Sam Querrey 2–0
 Nikoloz Basilashvili 2–1
 Reilly Opelka 1–0
 Benoît Paire 1–0
 Andreas Seppi 1–0
 Marcel Granollers 1–1
 Frances Tiafoe 1–1
 Aslan Karatsev 1–3
 Borna Ćorić 0–1
 Pablo Cuevas 0–1
 Chung Hyeon 0–1
 Feliciano López 0–1
 Viktor Troicki 0–1
 Nick Kyrgios 0–2
 Albert Ramos Viñolas 0–2
 Alex de Minaur 0–3

*

Notes

References

External links 
 
 

1995 births
Living people
Italian male tennis players
Sportspeople from Turin
Tennis players at the 2020 Summer Olympics
Olympic tennis players of Italy
21st-century Italian people